Catherine Bamugemereire is a Ugandan lawyer and judge who, since 2015, has served as a Justice of the Court of Appeal of Uganda, which doubles as Uganda's Constitutional Court.

Background and education
She was born in Bubulo, in the then Mbale District, but today is Manafwa District, in the 1970s. She attended Nabumali High School for her secondary education. She holds a Bachelor of Laws, awarded in 1992 by Makerere University, in Kampala, the capital and largest in the county. She also holds a Diploma in Legal Practice, awarded by the Law Development Centre, also in Kampala. Her Master of Laws in Comparative Law and International Law, was obtained from Southern Methodist University, in Dallas, Texas, United States, in 2003.

Career
Bamugemereire first worked in 1993, as a State Attorney in the Uganda Ministry of Justice and Constitutional Affairs, based in the town of Arua, Arua District, in the West Nile sub-region. Later, she was appointed as a Grade One Magistrate. She rose through the ranks to the rank of Chief Magistrate of "the White Collar Criminal Court in Uganda in the 1990s".

In 2001, she took leave from the bench and became a legal adviser to Shell Mexico LPG in Mexico City. After that she studied for her master's degree in the United States. In 2003, she relocated to the United Kingdom and worked as Associate Lecturer at the University of Surrey, for seven years.

In 2010, the Ugandan Judiciary appointed her a Judge in the High Court, to work in the Anti-Corruption and Family Divisions of the Court. She conducts civil and criminal court assignments throughout Uganda. She is an expert on corruption, and has spoken widely and written extensively about the subject. In 2015, she was appointed to Uganda’s Court of Appeal/Constitutional Court, where she still serves, as of November 2017.

Commissions of inquiry
Catherine Bamugemereire has chaired three national investigations in matters of corruption in government departments: (a) the tribunal that examined Kampala Capital City Authority, from June 2013 until November 2013. (b) the inquiry into the Uganda National Roads Authority, from June 2015 until January 2016 and (c) the Commission of Inquiry into land grabbing and land wrangles in Uganda's Land Sector, that started in 2017.

Family
She is married to George Bamugemereire and they are blessed with two children.

Other consideration
In 2017, Southern Methodist University bestowed on her the Distinguished Global Alumni Award, in recognition of her body of work.

See also
Ministry of Justice and Constitutional Affairs (Uganda)

References

External links
 Parliament Vets Appointed Judges
 Who Are the New Judges?

20th-century Ugandan judges
1970s births
Living people
Ugandan women lawyers
Ugandan women judges
Makerere University alumni
Law Development Centre alumni
Southern Methodist University alumni
People from Manafwa District
People from Eastern Region, Uganda
Academics of the University of Surrey
Justices of the Court of Appeal of Uganda
21st-century Ugandan judges
20th-century women judges
21st-century women judges